Susannah and the Elders is a circa 1580 oil-on-canvas painting depicting Susannah and the Elders by Paolo Veronese. It is now on permanent display at the Palazzo Bianco in Genoa. It is first recorded as being in Genoa in the 18th century. Previous owners include Gaspar Méndez de Haro, 7th Marquis of Carpio, a 17th-century Spanish collector. 

A wall surrounds and encloses the scene. A small dog—a symbol of fidelity and incorruptibility—and a statue of a satyr that looks lewdly at Susannah are also depicted in the painting. Veronese used these three symbols of the wall, dog, and satyr in other paintings of the same biblical theme and around the same time period in similar works preserved at the Louvre in Paris.

Paintings by Paolo Veronese
1580 paintings
Veronese
Dogs in art
Paintings in the collection of the Musei di Strada Nuova